Pristimantis nebulosus is a species of frog in the family Strabomantidae.
It is endemic to Peru.

Its natural habitats are tropical moist montane forest and high-altitude shrubland.

References

nebulosus
Amphibians of Peru
Endemic fauna of Peru
Taxonomy articles created by Polbot
Taxobox binomials not recognized by IUCN